Route 414, also known as La Scie Highway, is a highway located on the Baie Verte Peninsula of Newfoundland in the Canadian province of Newfoundland and Labrador.  Its western terminus is the intersection at Route 410, about 7 kilometres south of Baie Verte, and its eastern terminus is the Town of La Scie.

Route description

Route 414 begins at an intersection with Route 410 (Dorset Trail) just south of Baie Verte. It heads eastward down the centre of the eastern half of the peninsula, having intersections with Route 418 (Ming's Bight Road), Route 417 (Pacquet Road), and Route 415 (Nipper's Harbour Road). The highway travels closer to the coastline as it has an intersection with a local roads leading to Harbour Round, Brent's Cove, Tilt Cove, Shoe Cove, as well as having an intersection with Route 416 (Round Harbour Road). Route 414 turns northward to have an intersection with Cape St. John Road, which provides access to the site of the historic La Scie Air Station, before entering the town limits of La Scie, where Route 414 comes to an end at an intersection with Water Street in Downtown.

Major intersections

References

414